Restaurant Startup is an American food competition series that aired for three seasons on CNBC, from 2014 to 2016. In the show, two judge-investors meet with aspiring chefs, taste their food, hear their concept and decide whom they want to support in their food career. During the first two seasons, the judges-investors were celebrity restaurateurs Joe Bastianich and Tim Love. In the third season, the judges-investors were Bastianich, Love and Elizabeth Blau, with two of the three appearing in each episode.

Each episode is divided into four parts: first, judges-investors choose among two competing pitches for a new restaurant. Then, the winning team gets $7,500, a location and various helpers to refine their restaurant idea (including logo design, decor, and menu) and turn the concept into a functioning restaurant in 36 hours. Then, customers are brought in and the team runs the restaurant over several hours. Finally, the team meets with the investors, and one or both of the investors may then make an investment offer.

The series premiered on July 8, 2014. Its final episode aired on March 2, 2016.

Episodes

Season 1

Season 2

Season 3

See also
 Shark Tank

References

External links
 Official page
 Restaurant Startup on Internet Movie Database

2014 American television series debuts
2016 American television series endings
CNBC original programming
2010s American reality television series
Television series by Reveille Productions